Flip4Mac from Telestream, Inc. was a digital media software for the macOS operating system. It was known for being the only QuickTime component for macOS to support Windows Media Video, and was distributed by Microsoft as a substitute after they discontinued their media player for Macintosh computers.

Features 
Telestream previously offered a free standalone player also known as Flip Player while charging for their Pro and Studio features until the release of v3.3 on May 1, 2014, when they began charging for Flip4Mac Player (plug-in and standalone player combined).

There are four versions of Flip4Mac Player:
 Flip4Mac Player ($9.99)

Play Windows Media files (.wma and .wmv) directly in QuickTime applications and view Windows Media content on the Internet using a web browser
 Flip4Mac Player Pro ($29)

Adds the ability to import WMV and WMA files for editing and conversion to QuickTime formats or iOS devices
 Flip4Mac Studio ($49)

Includes all the features of Player Pro, and adds the ability to create standard definition (up to 768 x 576) WMV files using preset templates and custom encoding profiles
 Flip4Mac Studio Pro HD ($179)

Includes all the features of Studio, and adds two-pass HD (up to 1920 x 1080), VBR encoding and pro audio features

Technical specifications 
Below is the following technical specifications for Flip4Mac Player:

Codec support

NOTE: Exporting WMV9 Advanced and WMA Professional and Lossless is supported only by Flip4Mac Studio Pro HD

Network stream protocols

Frame sizes available for export

System requirements 
In order to run Flip4Mac, you need to meet the following specifications:
 Intel-based Mac
 Mac OS X Snow Leopard or later
NOTE: Please note if running on Snow Leopard, you need to update to 10.6.8 via Apple Software Update.

Windows Media Components for QuickTime 

Windows Media Components for QuickTime allow free transparent playback of the most common Windows Media Video and Windows Media Audio formats on macOS inside QuickTime applications and web browsers.

On January 12, 2006, Microsoft discontinued the Macintosh version of Windows Media Player and began distributing Flip4Mac Player for free until May 1, 2014, when Telestream began charging for Flip4Mac Player. Microsoft's website refers the product as Windows Media Components for QuickTime while Telestream just refers to Flip4Mac.

Windows Media

Advanced Stream Redirector 

Advanced Stream Redirector (ASX) file format is a type of Extensible Markup Language (XML) metafile designed to store a playlist of Windows Media files for a multimedia presentation. Flip4Mac currently supports the following MIME types:

{| class="wikitable" style="text-align:center;"
|-
| video/x-ms-wmv
| audio/x-ms-wma
|-
| video/x-ms-wm
| video/x-ms-asf
|-
| video/x-ms-wvx
| video/x-ms-wmx
|-
| audio/x-ms-wax
| video/x-ms-asx
|-
|}

Advanced Systems Format 

Advanced Systems Format (ASF) is Microsoft's proprietary digital audio/digital video container format, especially meant for streaming media.

Windows Media Audio 

Windows Media Audio (WMA) is an audio data compression technology developed by Microsoft. The name can be used to refer to its audio file format or its audio codecs.

Windows Media Digital Rights Management 

Flip4Mac is unable to play content that has been protected using digital rights management.

Windows Media Video 

Windows Media Video (WMV) is a video data compression technology developed by Microsoft.

Version history 
 Flip4Mac 2.1 was released in July 2006 with support for Intel-based Macs.
 Flip4Mac 3.0 was released in September 2012 with support for 64-bit improvements as well as Gatekeeper. It also includes Flip Player, a new multi-format video player with the ability to play the most common Windows Media formats.
 Flip4Mac 3.1 was released in February 2013 with support for the third generation MacBook Pros, MacBooks (relaunched version of the original MacBook line), and iMacs with Retina display. It also includes the ability to export videos to iTunes from Flip Player.
 Flip4Mac 3.2 was released in May 2013 with support for dramatically improved load time for ASF (.wmv, .wma, .wm, .wmp, .asf, etc.) file formats.
 Flip4Mac 3.3 was released in May 2014 with several minor 3.3.X updates with 3.3.7 being the latest update. Several updates include re-supporting Mac OS X Snow Leopard (after the support being removed in 3.0), and natively supporting OS X Yosemite (10.10) and OS X El Capitan (10.11).
 The software is no longer supported higher than OS X El Capitan (10.11). As a replacement Telestream advises users to try their Switch4Player software.

See also 
 Perian

References

Further reading 
Flip4Mac has been mentioned in the following books:
 Switching to the Mac: The Missing Manual, OS X Yosemite Edition

External links 
  – official site

MacOS multimedia software
MacOS media players